The 1920 Oklahoma Sooners football team represented the University of Oklahoma in the 1920 college football season. In their 16th year under head coach Bennie Owen, the Sooners compiled a 6–0–1 record (4–0–1 against conference opponents), won the Missouri Valley Conference championship, and outscored their opponents by a combined total of 176 to 51.

Two Sooners were recognized as All-Americans: tackle Roy "Soupy" Smoot and halfback Phil White.

Five Sooners received All-Missouri Valley Conference honors: back Harry Hill; end Howard Marsh; guard Bill McKinley; tackle Roy Smoot; and back Sol Swatek.  Marsh was the first Sooner to receive all-conference honors on three occasions, receiving the honors each year from 1920 to 1922.

Schedule

References

Oklahoma
Oklahoma Sooners football seasons
Missouri Valley Conference football champion seasons
College football undefeated seasons
Oklahoma Sooners football